William Thornton Innes III, L.H.D. (February 2, 1874 – February 27, 1969) was an American aquarist, author, photographer, printer and publisher. Innes was the author of numerous influential books and hundreds of articles about aquarium fish, aquatic plants and aquarium maintenance  during the formative years of the aquarium hobby in America. Born in Philadelphia, he was the founder, publisher and editor of The Aquarium, the first successful national magazine on the subject of keeping freshwater tropical fishes. The magazine ran monthly for thirty-five years from May 1932 through January 1967.

Graduating from Friends' Central School, Philadelphia, he entered the printing concern of his father, in 1895. In 1899 he married Mary Weber Weaver. From the 1920s he organized aquarium shows in Philadelphia's Horticultural Hall.

Exotic Aquarium Fishes

Original
Innes is best remembered as author and publisher of the book, Exotic Aquarium Fishes, which was printed by his family's printing firm in Philadelphia in 1935 and went through nineteen editions. It quickly became the seminal work on the subject and has often been called 'the aquarium bible.' Beautifully produced with many lavish elements by his own printing firm, and written in a simple but elegant and compelling style by Innes alone, the book also included photographs taken by Innes for each of the fish species. He had decided that the Kodachrome film of the day required too much light and did not accurately show the true colors of various fishes. Instead, he shot black-and-white photographs that were hand-painted, test-printed, and then repainted to fine-tune the color for publication.

Images
These color plates, considered works of art by many, became the object of an infamous lawsuit some years later. Dr Innes was shocked to learn that Dr Herbert Axelrod had used these now-famous plates from Exotic Aquarium Fishes in a book produced by his publishing company, TFH Publications. Innes sued. He won the case in 1955, but was awarded only $1, plus court costs, since the court could not determine that any monetary damage had been done.

Later editions
Innes held the desire  that the book would be updated on a regular basis, even after his death, and collaborated with younger friend and colleague, Dr. George S. Myers, to that end. After Innes Publishing ended its production of the book, other entities published more economical editions identified as the '19th edition, revised.' When Innes failed to renew the copyright of the first edition,  Axelrod quickly took advantage of the situation and published a new version of the classic. All of these editions lack the production quality of the original nineteen editions published by Innes, which remain to this day highly collectable and widely used by aquarists. They can  be identified by their dark green, 'leatherette' covers and binding, featuring an image of a trio of harlequin rasboras stamped in 14k gold.

Other work

Other books for which he served as author, publisher, principal photographer and printer include Goldfish Varieties and Tropical Aquarium Fishes  (1917) which ran through fifteen editions by 1935; The Modern Aquarium  (1929); Your Aquarium  (1945); Goldfish Varieties and Water Gardens  (1947); and Aquarium Highlights (1951).

Honors

Dr. Myers, who first described the neon tetra, had named that fish Hyphessobrycon innesi in honor of Innes. This popular aquarium species was later moved to the genus Paracheirodon and is now known as Paracheirodon innesi. The neon tetra is perhaps the best-known of several fish species that have been named in honor of this pioneer in the aquarium hobby. A water lily cultivar of the genus Nymphaea has also been named in his honor.

Temple University conferred upon him the Doctorate of Humane Letters in 1951.

On the occasion of Dr. Innes's 80th birthday in 1954, Dr. Myers wrote a tribute to him, in the February issue of The Aquarium, referring to William T. Innes as "the best known and most respected aquarist and authority on aquariums in the world. His books, his photographs and his influence on this field have educated millions."

An extensive collection of his writings, sketches, photographs and correspondence is housed at the American Philosophical Society in Philadelphia.

See also
:Category:Taxa named by William T. Innes

ReferencesExotic Aquarium Fishes, 1st edition, Innes & Sons Publishing Co., Philadelphia, PA  1935Exotic Aquarium Fishes, 19th edition, revised, Metaframe, Maywood, NJ 1966The Aquarium'', "Innes Anniversary Issue", Vol. XXIII, No. 2, February 1954

American ichthyologists
American publishers (people)
American photographers
Writers from Philadelphia
American printers
Fishkeeping
American nature writers
American male non-fiction writers